Ha is the third solo album by American indie hip hop artist Doseone. It was released in 2005. The album features contributions from Jel, Alias, Jordan Dalrymple and John Herndon.

Track listing
 "Ha" - 2:49
 "The Tale of the Private Mind" - 3:27
 "The Universe in 6 Jumps" - 4:48
 "By Horoscope Light I&II" - 3:38
 "Axejaw" - 3:38
 "Lullaby #2418a" - 5:04
 "Enter Ed's Head" - 2:40
 "Wind Machine Lining" - 4:04
 "Of Going" - 7:07

References

2005 albums
Doseone albums